John Derby (born March 24, 1968) is a former linebacker in the National Football League (NFL). Derby was a member of the Detroit Lions during the 1992 NFL season.

His son, A. J., is a tight end with the New England Patriots of the NFL, and his son, Zach, is a tight-end, with the Iowa Hawkeyes football team. Derby is also the brother of former NFL player Glenn Derby.

References

People from Oconomowoc, Wisconsin
Players of American football from Wisconsin
Detroit Lions players
American football linebackers
Iowa Hawkeyes football players
1968 births
Living people
Sportspeople from the Milwaukee metropolitan area